Fox was an African/South African pay television channel, launched in 2010 as the regional variant of the American broadcast network. The channel was a broad-based entertainment channel, unlike its sister channel FX, which restricted its output to older audiences.

History

Fox Entertainment (2010–2013) 
The channel was launched on 1 May 2010 (along with Fox Retro, FX, Baby TV, and the European version of Fuel TV) through TopTV. The network launched with an 18–35 demographic focus, airing mainly programming originated from the United States by the Fox broadcast network and FX, along with other acquired programming.

At launch, the channel took part in the worldwide premiere of The Walking Dead and the "Zombie Invasion Event" promotion that led up to it. After the final episode of the first season of The Walking Dead aired, it re-aired a director's cut of the pilot without editing.

Fox (2013–2021) 
The channel was simply rebranded to Fox on 9 April 2013, shortly after MultiChoice added the channel on DStv. New series were added to the schedule, and it took a more broad-based 18–49 audience focus.

In March 2019, all the Fox Networks Group channels were acquired by The Walt Disney Company due to the acquisition of 21st Century Fox.

On 1 October 2019, FNG networks, including Fox, were removed from StarSat due to failed retransmission consent negotiations, then returned on 24 February 2020 when the parties came to terms.

Closure 
On 24 August 2021, it was announced that Fox would cease broadcasting in Africa on 1 October 2021, along with the Asian and German versions, in favour of most of its content shifting to Star on Disney+, as it launches in the region in 18 May 2022.

See also 
 Fox (international)

References 

Fox Channel
Television networks
Television in Africa
Television channels and stations established in 2010
Television channels and stations disestablished in 2021
Television stations in South Africa
2010 establishments in South Africa
2021 disestablishments in Africa
Defunct mass media in South Africa